Charles Brewster Benedict (February 7, 1828 – October 3, 1901) was an American lawyer and politician who served one term as a U.S. Representative from New York from 1877 to 1879.

Biography
Born in Attica, Wyoming County, New York, Benedict was the son of  Thomas and Sarah Brewster Benedict. He attended the public schools and Oberlin College, Oberlin, Ohio. He married Sophronia B. Matteson on August 6, 1853 in Darien, New York, and they had five children, Lewis, Helen, Frances, Clara, and Charles.

Career
Benedict taught school as well as engaged in agricultural pursuits. He studied law, and was admitted to the bar in 1856. He commenced practice in Attica, New York, and was the Justice of the Peace from 1854 to 1860. He organized and was president of the Attica National Bank, also Bank of Attica and the First National bank of Moorhead, Minnesota. His land holdings in Minnesota and North Dakota were very extensive.

A member of the board of supervisors of Wyoming County from 1869 to 1871 and from 1873 to 1875, Benedict served a part of the time as chairman. He served as member of the Democratic State committee in 1875.

Benedict was elected as a Democrat to the Forty-fifth Congress (March 4, 1877 – March 3, 1879). He was not a candidate for renomination in 1878, and resumed banking in Attica, New York.

Death
Benecict died in Attica, Wyoming County, New York, on October 3, 1901 (age 73 years, 238 days). He is interred at Forest Hill Cemetery, Attica, New York.

References

External links

1828 births
1901 deaths
People from Attica, New York
Oberlin College alumni
New York (state) lawyers
Democratic Party members of the United States House of Representatives from New York (state)
19th-century American politicians